Teen Patti is a 2010 Indian Hindi-language thriller film directed by Leena Yadav. It stars Amitabh Bachchan, Ben Kingsley, R. Madhavan, Raima Sen and debutant Shraddha Kapoor. The film is produced by Ambika Hinduja under the banners of Hinduja Ventures and Serendipity Films. The film follows a mathematics professor, played by  Bachchan, who is trying to write a thesis on probability and relates it to the Indian card game of Teen Patti.

Plot
The story begins with Venkat Subramaniam (Amitabh Bachchan), an Indian professor of mathematics, software engineering, and a genius, teaching mathematics in his village to kids when a postman comes with a letter. The letter is from British mathematician Perci Trachtenberg (Ben Kingsley), widely regarded as the world's greatest living mathematician, who invites Venkat to a high rolling casino in London. Venkat tells Perci about an equation that could not only change the dialogue on mathematics forever, but one that has already left an indelible impression of guilt  — for many painful reasons — on Venkat's life. It is shown in the past that the reclusive genius Venkat has cracked a theory that could redefine the principles of probability and randomness. Venkat tries to use this experiment in a game called Teen Patti (a poker game), which he plays on the Internet. According to this experiment if a person playing Teen Patti knows the three cards with one of the players (except him) he/she can guess the other cards with the rest of the players and therefore can guess who is going to win with the theory of probability.

Venkat succeeds on his theory and submits his report to the institute where he teaches, but they reject his report. Venkat is sure about his theory and wants to try out in reality with live players. So he talks with younger professor Shantanu Biswas (R. Madhavan) about his theory and tells him to get three students to try out this experiment. Shantanu arranges three students — Sid (Siddharth Kher), the college rockstar; Aparna or Apu (Shraddha Kapoor), the studious geek, who has a crush on Sid' and Vikram or Vikku (Dhruv Ganesh), the boy next door. They come together and start playing the game. Venkat's theory, like the last time, proves to be successful. Venkat says that after a few more games he'll be sure to crack his equation and even be able to study it better. Shantanu tells him that he should try using his theory in the real world, where there are people who actually gamble and play Teen Patti, i.e. in underground dens or "addas".

Although Venkat has no interest in the money that could come from practicing his equation to crack Teen Patti, he eventually succumbs to Shantanu's charismatic persuasion. Soon, with the help of his new students, they explore the addas of wild Bombay. Later another student from the institute, Abbas (Vaibhav Talwar), the rich spoiled brat joins the gang and arranges for them parties in casinos, private clubs, etc. But what starts out as an experiment between a charismatic young professor and an eccentric older one soon descends into a game neither of them can control. The money they earn gets stolen; someone is blackmailing them; they get greedy about money and, in the course of time, they change into different people and even start betraying each other.

Cast
 Amitabh Bachchan as Prof. Venkat Subramaniam
 Ben Kingsley as Perci Trachtenberg
 R. Madhavan as Prof. Shantanu Biswas
 Dhruv Ganesh as Vikram Ashwin Dhar
 Ashu Sharma as Rammi
 Shraddha Kapoor as Aparna Khanna (Apu)
 Siddharth Kher as  Siddharth Bajaj (Sid)
 Vaibhav Talwar as Abbas Sheikh
 Saira Mohan as K.
 Raima Sen as Shivani Mukherjee
 Ajay Devgn as Sunny (Cameo appearance)
 Jackie Shroff as Tony Milano (Special Appearance)
 Mahesh Manjrekar as Dagdu Seth
 Ranjeet
 Shakti Kapoor as Prem London (Cameo appearance)
 Tinnu Anand as Billu
 Radhika Shah as Card Dealer
 Ganesh Yadav as Police Inspector
 Maria Gomez as item number Neeyat

Music

Music of the film is composed by Salim–Sulaiman and the lyrics are penned by Ajinkya Iyer and Irfan Siddiqui. Most of the tracks have a western feel associated to them. The songs are remixed by Abhijit Vaghani. Sunidhi Chauhan's rendition of the song Neeyat Kharab Hai was widely acclaimed.

Production
The film was shot in India and England. Production designer Ayesha Punvani created gambling dens in places like abandoned train yards, dockyards, abandoned factories, mills that have been shut down and an ice factory.

Reception
Film critic and author Anupama Chopra called it "a train wreck of a movie".

Influences
Teen Patti is inspired by the English film 21 (without any mention). The end of the film when Amitabh Bachchan refuses to accept Isaac Newton Award for Applied Mathematics is inspired by the refusal of the Fields Medal by the Russian mathematician Grigori Perelman.

References

External links
 

2010 films
2010s Hindi-language films
Indian films about gambling
2010 thriller drama films
Films about mathematics
English-language Indian films
Films directed by Leena Yadav
Indian thriller drama films
2010 drama films